Quagga is an extinct subspecies of the plains zebra.

Quagga may also refer to:
 Quagga (software), the unofficial successor to GNU Zebra, a routing software suite
 Quagga catshark, a small shark type
 Quagga mussel, a bivalve species native to Ukraine

See also
 Quokka, an Australian marsupial

Animal common name disambiguation pages